Kenneth Alan Ribet (born June 28, 1948) is an American mathematician working in algebraic number theory and algebraic geometry. He is known for the Herbrand–Ribet theorem and Ribet's theorem, which were key ingredients in the proof of Fermat's Last Theorem, as well as for his service as President of the American Mathematical Society from 2017 to 2019. He is currently a professor of mathematics at the University of California, Berkeley.

Early life and education 
Kenneth Ribet was born in Brooklyn, New York to parents David Ribet and Pearl Ribet, both Jewish, on June 28, 1948. As a student at Far Rockaway High School, Ribet was on a competitive mathematics team, but his first field of study was chemistry.

Ribet earned his bachelor's degree and master's degree from Brown University in 1969. In 1973, Ribet received his Ph.D. from Harvard University under the supervision of John Tate.

Career
After receiving his doctoral degree, Ribet taught at Princeton University for three years before spending two years doing research in Paris. In 1978, Ribet joined the Department of Mathematics at the University of California, Berkeley, where he served three separate terms as supervisor of the department's graduate program, supervisor of the department's undergraduate program, and supervisor of the department's development.

Ribet has served as an editor for several mathematics journals, a book series editor for the Cambridge University Press, and a book series editor for Springer. He also served on the United States National Committee for Mathematics, representing the United States at the International Mathematical Union, and was the Chair of the Mathematics section of the National Academy of Sciences.

From February 1, 2017 to January 31, 2019, Ribet was President of the American Mathematical Society.

Research

Ribet's contributions in number theory and algebraic geometry were described by Benedict Gross and Barry Mazur as being "key to our understanding of the connections between the theory of modular forms and the ℓ-adic representations of the absolute Galois group of the field of rational numbers."

Ribet is credited with paving the way towards Andrew Wiles's proof of Fermat's Last Theorem. In 1986, Ribet proved that the epsilon conjecture formulated by Jean-Pierre Serre was true, and thereby proved that Fermat's Last Theorem would follow from the Taniyama–Shimura conjecture. Crucially it also followed that the full conjecture was not needed, but a special case, that of semistable elliptic curves, sufficed. An earlier theorem of Ribet's, the Herbrand–Ribet theorem, is the converse to Herbrand's theorem on the divisibility properties of Bernoulli numbers and is also related to Fermat's Last Theorem.

Awards and honors
Ribet received the Fermat Prize in 1989 jointly with Abbas Bahri. He was elected to the American Academy of Arts and Sciences in 1997 and the National Academy of Sciences in 2000. In 2012, he became a Fellow of the American Mathematical Society. In 2017, Ribet received the Brouwer Medal.

In 1988, Ribet was inducted as a vigneron d'honneur by the Jurade de Saint-Émilion. In 1998, Ribet received an honorary doctorate from Brown University.

Personal life
Ribet is married to statistician Lisa Goldberg.

References

External links

Ken Ribet's webpage
Ken Ribet's faculty page at UC Berkeley
 
Ken Ribet's Author Profile on MathSciNet

Living people
Arithmetic geometers
Members of the United States National Academy of Sciences
Fellows of the American Mathematical Society
20th-century American mathematicians
21st-century American mathematicians
Brown University alumni
Harvard University alumni
University of California, Berkeley faculty
Far Rockaway High School alumni
1948 births
Fermat's Last Theorem
Presidents of the American Mathematical Society
Mathematicians from New York (state)